Trondheim byleksikon ("Trondheim City Encyclopedia") is a printed encyclopedia which covers Trondheim, Norway. Published by Kunnskapsforlaget and written by Terje Bratberg, the first edition was published in 1996 ahead of the city's 1000th anniversary the following year. The first edition contained 4200 entries. The second edition was published in 2008 and contains 5000 entries. According to the author, a large part of the expansion is connected with better coverage of businesses and commerce.

References

External links
 First edition at the National Library (requires Norwegian IP address)

Mass media in Trondheim
Norwegian encyclopedias
1996 non-fiction books
2008 non-fiction books
20th-century encyclopedias
21st-century encyclopedias